The Institute of Cultural Affairs International (ICA International) is a global network of national ICA organizations that carry out human development programming in their respective nations. ICA International is an international non-governmental organization (INGO) that works to influence development policy. By putting culture at the center of development, it seeks to provide the people the power to shape their own destiny. 

ICA International has a great mission to advocate for people and actualize the fundamental right of all people to define and shape their own future towards the goal of realizing sustainable solutions to human challenges.

Objectives

The strategic objectives of ICA International are:

To facilitate the sharing of our experiences, values, and lessons at the global level, in order to influence international development policy.

To develop and facilitate global partnerships.

To address human development challenges.

To coordinate programs and initiatives involving multiple member ICA organizations for global impact.

Finally, to support member ICAs through training and capacity building initiatives and facilitate regular networking and interchange among member ICAs.

Relationships

ICA International maintains relationships with key international bodies and other international organisations, including:

Special Consultative Status with the United Nations Economic and Social Council (ECOSOC);
Liaison status with the Food and Agriculture Organisation of the United Nations (FAO);
Working relation status with the World Health Organisation (WHO);
Consultative Status with the United Nations Children’s Fund (UNICEF);
Service on the Non Governmental Organisation Consultative Group for the International Fund of Agriculture Development (IFAD); and
Membership in CIVICUS, the World Alliance for Citizen Participation.

ICA International is a global network of national member organizations located in the following countries: Australia, Bangladesh, Belgium, Benin, Bosnia and Herzegovina, Canada, Chile, Côte d'Ivoire, Cameroon, Egypt, Ghana, Guatemala, India, Japan, Kenya, Malaysia, Nepal, Netherlands, Nigeria, Peru, South Africa, Taiwan, Tajikistan, Tanzania, Togo, Uganda, United States, Zambia, and Zimbabwe. ICA Nepal hosted the 8th global conference on human development in Kahtmnandu, Nepal in late 2012. In this occasion a book entitled 'Changing lives changing society' was released.

In the 1970s and 1980s the Institute of Cultural Affairs established several thousand model villages, around the world, to demonstrate what is possible when people work together.

The secretariat office is in Montreal, Quebec, Canada.

References

External links
 Official site

Development charities based in Canada
Community-building organizations